This list shows places located wholly or partly within the London Borough of Bexley in southeast London, United Kingdom. Places in italics are partly outside the borough. Places in bold have their own articles with that title; places not in bold are either redirects to other place articles that encompass them, or have no article at all.

The chart shows the electoral wards, the United Kingdom constituencies, post towns, postcodes and the national dialing code that cover the listed places. When these are in bold it means they cover a large part of the place, where as not in bold means they only cover a small part. If they are in italics it means they cover some of the place, but only outside the London Borough of Bexley. The chart also contains Coordinates and an image for each place.

The borough is mostly in the DA postcode area, but the western part of the borough is in the SE postcode area. Postcode districts, DA6, DA7, DA8, DA17, and DA18 are wholly within the London Borough of Bexley, while DA1, DA5, DA14, DA15, DA16, SE2, SE9, SE18 and SE28 postcode districts are located partly within the borough. The national dialing code 020 covers the western side of the bough, while 01322 covers the eastern side.

The borough contains two constituencies, Bexleyheath and Crayford, and Old Bexley and Sidcup in full, and shares a third, Erith and Thamesmead with the Royal Borough of Greenwich.

The borough is split into 17 electoral wards for elections to the London Borough of Bexley. The wards are Barnehurst, Belvedere, Bexleyheath, Blackfen and Lamorbey, Blendon and Penhill, Crayford, Crook Log, East Wickham, Erith, Falconwood and Welling Longlands, Northumberland Heath, Sidcup, Slade Green and Northend, St Mary's and St James, Thamesmead East, and West Heath

References

Lists of places in London
Districts of the London Borough of Bexley